William Nobles (December 23, 1892 – November 24, 1968) was an American cinematographer.

Biography
Born in 1892 in Waubay, South Dakota, Nobles worked on nearly 200 Hollywood films in a career that spanned five decades, from 1917 to 1966. His most noted cinematography work is probably the Gene Autry film Red River Valley in 1936, and the original Dick Tracy serial film in 1937, working with Edgar Lyons.

One author described his contribution to filmmaking as follows:

Another notes the "fine photography" by Nobles in The Fighting Devil Dogs, 1938.

Nobles died in 1968 in Costa Mesa, California, at the age of 75.

Partial filmography
 The Little Patriot (1917)
 Cyclone Bliss (1921)
Barb Wire (1922)
 The Crow's Nest (1922)
 The Red Warning (1923)
 The White Outlaw (1925)
 Bustin' Thru (1925)
 The Fighting Peacemaker (1926)
 Looking for Trouble (1926)
 A Six Shootin' Romance (1926)
 The Demon (1926)
 The Wild Horse Stampede (1926)
 Red Hot Leather (1926)
 The Border Sheriff (1926)
 The Fighting Three (1927)
 Rough and Ready (1927)
 Overland Bound (1929)
 The Phantom of the Desert (1930)
 Beyond the Rio Grande (1930)
 Firebrand Jordan (1930)
 Westward Bound (1930)
 The Hurricane Horseman (1931)
 Red Fork Range (1931)
 Swanee River (1931)
 Hell's Valley (1931)
 The Cheyenne Cyclone (1931)
 The Law of the Tong (1931)
 West of Cheyenne (1931)
 Law and Lawless (1932)
 The Reckless Rider (1932)
 Outlaw Justice (1932)
 The Wyoming Whirlwind (1932)
 Gun Law (1933)
 Trouble Busters (1933)
 Via Pony Express (1933)
 Mystery Mountain (1934)
 The Man from Hell (1934)
 Red River Valley (1936)
 Dick Tracy (1937)
 Bill Cracks Down (1937)
 The Fighting Devil Dogs (1938)
 Heroes of the Saddle (1940)
 Hi-Yo Silver (1940)

References

External links

1892 births
1971 deaths
American cinematographers